Teresia Mbari Hinga is a Kenyan Christian feminist theologian who is a professor of religious studies at Santa Clara University in California.

Early life and education
Hinga was born in Kenya to Agnes Wairimu and Ernest Hinga, pioneer African Catholics who treated their male and female children equally, including in education. Hinga attended a Loreto high school. She received a bachelor's degree in English Literature and Religious Studies from Kenyatta University in 1977 and a master's in Religious Studies from Nairobi University in 1980. She earned in PhD from the University of Lancaster in the UK in 1990 with a thesis titled Women, Power and Liberation in an African Church: A Theological Case Study of the Legio Maria Church in Kenya on the role of women in African Christianity. Hinga is a founding member of the Circle of Concerned African Women Theologians and a member of the Kenyan Chapter of the Circle.

Career
Hinga is one of the co-founders of the Circle of Concerned African Women Theologians, established in 1989 at a gathering of African women theologians in Ghana. She was associate professor of religion at DePaul University in Chicago.

Hinga has been on the faculty at Santa Clara University since 2005.  She is a member of the Black Catholic Symposium of the American Academy of Religion and of the Association for the Academic Study of Religion in Africa. She is on the editorial board of the Journal of Global Catholicism.

Research and writing
Hinga's research interests including religion and women, African religious history, and the ethics of globalization. She argues that the Christ of the missionary enterprise was "ambivalent", both a conqueror legitimizing subjugation and a liberator. Women, in particular, need to reject any christology that "smacks of sexism and functions to entrench lopsided gender relations."

Hinga's 2017 book, African, Christian, Feminist:The Enduring Search for What Matters is a collection of essays that examine her journey from Africa to Silicon Valley, seeking to show the concrete impact of feminist work in religion in areas including HIV/AIDS and violence against women. It includes the story of Kimpa Vita, an African Catholic woman in the 1700s who was martyred for challenging missionary Christianity and its support of colonialism and slavery.

Selected publications

Books

Chapters

Journal articles

Personal life
Hinga has two children, Pauline and Anthony, and two grandchildren.

References

Living people
Kenyan Roman Catholics
Kenyatta University alumni
University of Nairobi alumni
Alumni of Lancaster University
Kenyan emigrants to the United States
Kenyan writers
Kenyan women writers
Kenyan feminists
Roman Catholic theologians
Christian feminist theologians
Women Christian theologians
DePaul University faculty
Santa Clara University faculty
Year of birth missing (living people)